KIAM (630 AM) is a radio station broadcasting a religious format. Licensed to Nenana, Alaska, United States, the station serves the Alaska Interior area.  The station is currently owned by Voice of Christ Ministries, Inc.

Translators
In addition to the main station, KIAM has an additional 18 translators to widen its broadcast area.

References

External links

Radio stations established in 1985
Moody Radio affiliate stations
1985 establishments in Alaska
IAM
Yukon–Koyukuk Census Area, Alaska